The 1983 Castrol 400 was an endurance race for Group C Touring Cars held at the Sandown Park circuit in Victoria, Australia on 11 September 1983. The race was staged over 129 laps of the 3.1 km circuit, totalling 399.9 km. It was Round 3 of the 1983 Australian Endurance Championship and Round 3 of the 1983 Australian Endurance Championship of Makes.

The race, which was the 18th annual Sandown long-distance race, was won by Allan Moffat driving a Mazda RX-7. The ease in which Moffat won his 5th Sandown endurance race put him as the hot favourite for the upcoming James Hardie 1000 at Bathurst. Moffat had stalked early race leaders Peter Brock and Allan Grice before they both fell by the wayside leaving the Mazda to take its second straight win in the Sandown enduro. Second place went to the JPS Team BMW 635 CSi of Jim Richards. The performance of the BMW suddenly saw the car as a darkhorse for Bathurst. Finishing third in their Holden Commodore were Warren Cullen and Ron Harrop.

Pre-race favourite and pole winner Peter Brock suffered a rare failure when he lost the brakes on his Marlboro Holden Dealer Team Commodore early on and actually hit the fence, forcing him out of the race. Brock later took over the second MHDT Commodore from John Harvey and eventually finished third on the road, however he was later disqualified as he had not cross-entered to drive the #25 car.

After a poor ATCC in which he lost his crown to Moffat, Dick Johnson served notice that the Ford XE Falcon would be a force at Bathurst after development work had cured the big Ford's suspension problems. Johnson put the now green coloured car on the front row matching Brock's pole time, although after winning the start his race ended with gearbox failure only a few hundred metres later.

Classes
As a round of the 1983 Australian Endurance Championship, cars competed in two classes:
 Up to 3000 cc
 Over 3000 cc

Results

Top 10 Qualifiers

Race

Note:
 The total number of starters has not yet been ascertained
 There were 16 finishers in the race
 Peter Brock took over the car of John Harvey after his own car suffered brake problems. The Brock/Harvey car placed third, but was subsequently disqualified due to the unauthorized driver change.

Statistics
 Pole position - #05 Peter Brock - (Holden VH Commodore) - 1:10.7
 Race time - 3 hrs 20 mins 0.4 secs
 Fastest lap - #43 Allan Moffat - (Mazda RX-7) - 1:10.9 (new lap record)

Notes & references

External links
 autopics.com.au

See also
 1983 Castrol 400 - full race

Motorsport at Sandown
Castrol 400
Pre-Bathurst 500